The 2012 Ohio elections were held on November 6, 2012 in the U.S. state of Ohio. Primary elections were held on March 6, 2012.

Federal

President 

Voters chose 18 electors to represent them in the Electoral College.

Senate

House 

|-
! 
| 
|  | Republican
| 2010
| Incumbent re-elected.
| nowrap | 

|-
! 
| 
|  | Republican
| 2005 
|  | Incumbent lost renominationNew member elected.Republican hold.
| nowrap | 

|-
! 
| colspan=3 data-sort-value="ZZZ" |None 
|  | New seat.New member elected.Democratic gain.
| nowrap | 

|-
! 
| 
|  | Republican
| 2006
| Incumbent re-elected.
| nowrap | 

|-
! 
| 
|  | Republican
| 2007 
| Incumbent re-elected.
| nowrap | 

|-
! 
| 
|  | Republican
| 2010
| Incumbent re-elected.
| nowrap | 

|-
! 
| 
|  | Republican
| 2010
| Incumbent re-elected.
| nowrap | 

|-
! 
| 
|  | Republican
| 1990
| Incumbent re-elected.
| nowrap | 

|-
! rowspan=2 | 
| 
|  | Democratic
| 1982
| Incumbent re-elected.
| rowspan=2 nowrap | 
|-
| 
|  | Democratic
| 1996
|  | Incumbent lost renomination.Democratic loss.

|-
! rowspan=2 | 
| 
|  | Republican
| 2002
| Incumbent re-elected.
| rowspan=2 nowrap | 
|-
| 
|  | Republican
| 2008
|  | Incumbent retired.Republican loss.

|-
! 
| 
|  | Democratic
| 2008
| Incumbent re-elected.
| nowrap | 

|-
! 
| 
|  | Republican
| 2000
| Incumbent re-elected.
| nowrap | 

|-
! 
| 
|  | Democratic
| 2002
| Incumbent re-elected.
| nowrap | 

|-
! 
| 
|  | Republican
| 1994
|  | Incumbent retired.New member elected.Republican hold.
| nowrap | 

|-
! 
| 
|  | Republican
| 2010
| Incumbent re-elected.
| nowrap | 

|-
! rowspan=2 | 
| 
|  | Republican
| 2010
| Incumbent re-elected.
| rowspan=2 nowrap | 
|-
| 
|  | Democratic
| 2006
|  | Incumbent lost re-election.Democratic loss.

|}

State

General Assembly

Supreme Court

References 

 
Ohio